The Uquian age is a period of geologic time (3.0–1.5 Ma) within the Pliocene and Pleistocene epochs of the Neogene used more specifically with South American Land Mammal Ages. It follows the Montehermosan and precedes the Ensenadan age.

References 

Hippopotamus Gorgops
 
Pliocene life
Piacenzian
Neogene South America
Quaternary animals of South America